Thomas Prichard or Tom Prichard may refer to:

 Thomas Prichard (priest, born c. 1591), Welsh clergyman and academic at the University of Oxford
 Thomas Prichard (priest, born 1910) (1910–1975), Archdeacon of Maidstone, 1968–72
 Thomas Octavius Prichard (1808–1847), English psychiatrist
 Tom Prichard (born 1959), American professional wrestler and author

See also
 Thomas Pritchard (disambiguation)